Asaarashi Daizaburo (born 8 July 1943 as Junji Sasaki) is a former sumo wrestler from Fukui, Japan. He made his professional debut in March 1959, and reached the top division in May 1969. His highest rank was maegashira 12. Upon retirement from active competition, he became an elder in the Japan Sumo Association, under the name  Takadagawa. He later acquired the Furiwake name (currently owned by Takamisakari) and reached the Sumo Association's mandatory retirement age in July 2008.

Career record

See also
Glossary of sumo terms
List of past sumo wrestlers

References

1943 births
Living people
Japanese sumo wrestlers
Sumo people from Fukui Prefecture